Rachel Moss is an Irish art historian and professor specialising in medieval art, with a particular interest in Insular art, medieval Irish Gospel books and monastic history. She is the current head of the Department of the History of Art at Trinity College Dublin, where she was became a fellow in 2022.

Moss has written extensively on the sources and iconography of medieval Irish art, its materials, methods and political and cultural settings. Her work includes detailed examinations of Irish round towers, high crosses, psalters, Celtic broochs, chalicees and house-shaped and other reliquary shrines, with a close focus on illuminated manuscripts such as the Stowe Missal, Book of Durrow and Book of Mulling.

Career
Moss has said that her interest in the medieval came from her grandfather, an archaeologist living in County Sligo, who took her on digs when she was a child. She remembered "vividly when I was six and he took me to see a dig. One of the archaeologists put a human jawbone in my hand and told me about how you could tell she was a young woman. As a post-graduate, she worked on literacy projects in the then deprived Fatima Mansions area of Dublin.

She became a fellow of the Society of Antiquaries of London in 2011, and was elected president of the Royal Society of Antiquaries of Ireland in 2013. She is the current Head of the Department of the History of Art at Trinity College Dublin.

Her 2014 survey "Medieval c. 400—c. 1600" was published by Yale University Press as part of their five-volume Art and architecture of Ireland series. Her book was described by the Royal Irish Academy as "an unrivalled account of all aspects of the rich and varied visual culture of Ireland in the Middle Ages. Based on decades of original research, the book contains over three hundred lively and informative essays." Writing for History Ireland, Peter Harbison said that Moss' book "covers a much greater span of time than all the others, and also deals with a much wider range of material. The major attractions are the famous manuscripts and metalwork from the earlier period, but there is a lot more besides—including the recently discovered Faddan More Psalter of c. 800. Stonework is covered extensively from the earlier medieval period: high crosses, round towers and all the church buildings from [the] Gallarus Oratory to Cormac’s Chapel."

Moss lives in Dublin and Sligo with her husband Jason Ellis, a sculptor.

Selected publications

Books (author)

"Medieval c. 400—c. 1600: Art and Architecture of Ireland". CT: Yale University Press, 2014. 
"An Insular Odyssey: Manuscript Culture in Early Christian Ireland and Beyond". Dublin: Four Courts Press, 2017. 
"The Book of Durrow". Dublin Trinity College Library; Thames and Hudson, 2018. 
"Making and Meaning in Insular Art". Dublin: Four Courts Press, 2007. 
"Edward Payne 1906-1991". Dublin: Moss & Glass, 1995.

Books (contributed)

"Art and Visual Literacy in the Early Irish Church". In: Boyle, Elizabeth. A Companion to the Church in Early Ireland, c. 400-c.1150. Dublin: Dublin Institute for Advanced Studies, 2020
"Resilience, restoration and revival: Insular art in later medieval Ireland". In: Thickpenny, Cynthia (ed). "Peopling Insular Art: Practice, Performance, Perception". Oxford: Oxbow, 2020
 "Irish Parish Churches: 1350-1550". In P. Barnwell (ed.) Places of Worship in the British Isles: 1350-1550, Donington, Shaun Tyas, 2019
 "Material culture: c. 1200-1550".  In B. Smith (ed.). Cambridge History of Ireland Volume 1. Cambridge: Cambridge University Press, 2018
 "The Art and the Pigments: A study of four Insular Gospel Books in the Library of Trinity College Dublin". In Panayotova and Ricciardi (eds) *Manuscripts in the Making: Art and Science. London and Turnhout: Brepols, 2017
 "Collective memory and municipal identity in the early modern Irish town".  In Dany Sandron (ed.), Le Passé dans la Ville. Paris: Presses de l'université Paris-Sorbonne, 2016

Articles (selected)

 "Romanesque Chevron Ornament: the language of British, Norman and Irish sculpture in the twelfth century". British Archaeological Reports Limited, 2009
 "Making and Meaning in Insular Art: Proceedings of the Fifth International Conference on Insular Art Held at Trinity College Dublin, 25-28 August 2005".  Dublin: Four Courts Press, 2007

References

External links
Book of Mulling – one of four precious early Irish manuscripts conserved at Trinity, overview by Moss
Online exhibition of the Book of Durrow curated by Moss for Trinity College Dublin

Academics of Trinity College Dublin
Alumni of Trinity College Dublin
Fellows of Trinity College Dublin
Irish art historians
Year of birth missing (living people)
Living people
Women art historians
21st-century Irish women
Irish women academics